Henry Vane Russell (14 January 1809 – 21 May 1846) was an English cricketer active in 1832 who played for Oxford University. He appeared in one first-class match, scoring eight runs with a highest score of 5*. He was born in Lewisham, Kent, the son of Robert and Elizabeth Russell. He was educated at Corpus Christi College, Oxford, then became a Church of England priest. He married Eliza Tylden in 1834. He was vicar of Stottesdon, Shropshire, at the date of his death.

Notes

1809 births
1846 deaths
People from Lewisham
English cricketers
Oxford University cricketers
Alumni of Corpus Christi College, Oxford
19th-century English Anglican priests